The Producers Guild Film Award for Best Female Debut (previously known as the Apsara Award for Best Female Debut) is given by the producers of the film and television guild as part of its annual award ceremony for Hindi films, to recognise a female actor who has delivered an outstanding performance in her debut film. While the official awards ceremony started in 2004, awards for the best female debut commenced two years later.

Winners

2000s

 2004 No award
 2005 No award
 2006Vidya Balan – Parineeta as Lalita
 2007 No award
 2008Deepika Padukone – Om Shanti Om as Shantipriya/Sandhya (Sandy)
 2009Mugdha Godse – Fashion as Janet Sequeira

2010s

 2010Anushka Sharma – Rab Ne Bana Di Jodi as Tania "Taani" Sahni
 2011Sonakshi Sinha – Dabangg as Rajo
 2012Parineeti Chopra – Ladies vs Ricky Bahl as Dimple Chaddha
 2013Ileana D'Cruz – Barfi! as Shruti Ghosh/Sengupta
 2014Vaani Kapoor – Shuddh Desi Romance as Tara
 2016Bhumi Pednekar – Dum Laga Ke Haisha as Sandhya Varma

See also
Producers Guild Film Awards
Producers Guild Film Award for Best Male Debut

References

Producers Guild Film Awards
Film awards for debut actress